was a town located in Aida District, Okayama Prefecture, Japan.

As of 2003, the town had an estimated population of 4,630 and a density of 84.99 persons per km². The total area was 54.48 km².

On March 31, 2005, Ōhara, along with the towns of Mimasaka, Aida and Sakutō, the village of Higashiawakura (all from Aida District), and the town of Katsuta (from Katsuta District), was merged to create the city of Mimasaka.

Geography

Adjoining municipalities
Okayama Prefecture
Sakutō
Nishiawakura
Higashiawakura
Katsuta
Hyōgo Prefecture
Sayō

Education
Ōhara Elementary School
Ōhara Junior High School
Okayama Prefectural Ōhara High School (Closure in 2006)

Transportation

Railways
Chizu Express
Chizu Line
Miyamoto Musashi Station - Ōhara Station

Road
National highways:
Route 373
Route 429
Prefectural roads:
Okayama Prefectural Route 5 (Sakutō-Ōhara)
Okayama Prefectural Route 240 (Shimoshō-Sayō)
Okayama Prefectural Route 357 (Kajinami-Tateishi)

Notable places and events
Village of Miyamoto Musashi
Main stone of Miyamoto Musashi Temple
Miyamoto Musashi's grave next to that of his parents
Ōhara-shuku (Shukuba)

References

External links
Official website of Mimasaka in Japanese

Dissolved municipalities of Okayama Prefecture
Mimasaka, Okayama